Elachista fuliginea is a moth of the family Elachistidae. It is found in North America, where it has been recorded from Massachusetts and southern Ontario.

The wingspan is 9–10 mm for males and about 10 mm for females. The forewings are sooty black with a faint purple tinge before the fascia and slightly irrorated (speckled) beyond the fascia which is lustrous white. The hindwings are dark grey, irrorated with black. Adults have been recorded on wing in July.

References

fuliginea
Moths described in 1948
Moths of North America